Baldwin is a Germanic name, composed of the elements bald "bold" and win "friend".

People 
 Baldwin (name)

Places

Canada 
 Baldwin, York Regional Municipality, Ontario
 Baldwin, Ontario, in Sudbury District
 Baldwin's Mills, Quebec

United States 
 Baldwin County, Alabama
 Baldwin, Florida
 Baldwin, Georgia
 Baldwin County, Georgia
 Baldwin, Illinois
 Baldwin, Iowa
 Baldwin, Louisiana
 Baldwin, Maine
 Baldwin, Maryland
 Baldwin, Michigan
 Baldwyn, Mississippi
 Baldwin, Chemung County, New York
 Baldwin, Nassau County, New York
 Baldwin (LIRR station)
 Baldwin, North Dakota
 Baldwin, Pennsylvania
 Baldwin, Wisconsin
 Baldwin (town), Wisconsin

Other places 

 Baldwin Street, in Dunedin, New Zealand, the world's steepest street
Baldwin Hills, neighborhood in Los Angeles, California
 Montgomery, Powys, named in Welsh "Trefaldwyn", meaning "The Town of Baldwin"

Companies 
 Baldwin Locomotive Works, one of the world's largest builders of steam locomotives in the 19th and 20th centuries
 Baldwin Piano Company, once the largest manufacturer of pianos and keyboard instruments in the US

Schools 
 Baldwin Boys High School, one of the schools in India
 Baldwin Girls High School, a sister school of Baldwin Boys High School
 The Baldwin School, a private all-girls school in Bryn Mawr, Pennsylvania, US
 University of Balamand

Other uses 
 Baldwin (apple)
 The Baldwin Brothers, a Chicago-based electronica band
 Baldwin the Eagle, official mascot of Boston College
 Baldwin's Tower in Tsarevets, Veliko Tarnovo, Bulgaria
 Tom Baldwin (The 4400), a fictional character
 Baldwin's rules, guidelines about the formation ring closure reactions
 Baldwin effect, a process by which environmental adaptation becomes a genetic one
 Baldwin guinea pig, a hairless breed similar to a Skinny pig

See also 
 Baldwin River (disambiguation)
 Justice Baldwin (disambiguation)
 Alexander & Baldwin